Foxcotte is a small hamlet in the civil parish of Charlton in the Test Valley district of Hampshire, England.

History 
Foxcotte was a manor of some notability during and after the reign of William the Conqueror

Land surrounding the hamlet is designated a "deserted medieval village" suggesting the hamlet was much larger, although the listing does not include any detail.

The history of the church is somewhat obscure, it seems the current structure was built in 1840 on the remains of, or in addition to an earlier medieval structure.

By 1912 the church was sufficiently deteriorated that it was listed as "Remains of"

On an 1805 map the hamlet was listed as "Fofcot" On an 1895 map it is listed as "Foxcott"

The hamlet is today made up of "Foxcotte Farm", the former Church (now a private house), a thatched house to the north, a post Second World-War in-fill house and arguably "Lower Farm" to the south.

Although the hamlet it significantly less rural than it once was, with the expansion of both Andover and Charlton, it is detached from the Andover area and, with the exception of the south-east, is fully surrounded by agricultural land.

Both the former chapel and manor farm house are grade two listed

References

Villages in Hampshire
Test Valley